Mesoclanis campiglossina is a species of tephritid or fruit flies in the genus Mesoclanis of the family Tephritidae.

Distribution
India.

References

Tephritinae
Insects described in 1944
Diptera of Asia